Neodictya is a genus of planthoppers in the family Dictyopharidae, native to Africa.

Species
GBIF lists:
Neodictya arethusa Linnavuori, 1973
Neodictya currax (Fennah, 1958)
Neodictya fluvialis Synave, 1965
Neodictya izzardi Synave, 1965
Neodictya paupera (Melichar, 1912)
Neodictya suavis (Fennah, 1958)

References 

Insects of Africa
Dictyopharinae
Auchenorrhyncha genera